"Get Happy" is a song composed by Harold Arlen, with lyrics written by Ted Koehler. It echoes themes of a Christian evangelical revivalist meeting song.

It was the first song they wrote together, and was introduced  in The Nine-Fifteen Revue in 1930.

Influenced by the Get Happy tradition, it is most associated with Judy Garland, who performed it in her last MGM film Summer Stock (1950) and in live concert performances throughout the rest of her life.  The versions from Summer Stock finished at #61 in AFI's 100 Years...100 Songs survey of top tunes in American cinema. An instrumental, hot jazz arrangement of the song, performed by Abe Lyman's Brunswick Recording Orchestra, served as the original theme music for Warner Bros.' Merrie Melodies cartoons from 1931 to 1933.

The song lyrics incorporate the title phrase in the longer phrase "Come on, get happy", but it should not be confused with the Partridge Family theme song "C'mon Get Happy".

English musician Elvis Costello named his fourth studio album, released in 1980, after the song.

Notable recordings
 Nat Shilkret & the Victor Orchestra (1930)
 Benny Goodman (1936)
 Art Tatum (1939)
 Red Norvo and his Selected Sextet (including Charlie Parker) (1945)
 Harry James with vocals by Doris Day – Young Man with a Horn (Columbia, 1950)
 Bud Powell – Jazz Giant (1950)
 Judy Garland – Summer Stock (1950)
 Frankie Laine (1951)
 Frank Sinatra – Swing Easy! (1954)
 Bing Crosby recorded the song in 1955 for use on his radio show and it was subsequently included in the box set The Bing Crosby CBS Radio Recordings (1954-56) issued by Mosaic Records (catalog MD7-245) in 2009. 
 Eddie Costa – Eddie Costa Vinnie Burke Trio (1956)
 Jerry Lewis (1956)
 Ella Fitzgerald – Ella Fitzgerald Sings the Harold Arlen Songbook (1961)
 Judy Garland with Barbra Streisand (medley with "Happy Days Are Here Again") – The Judy Garland Show (1963), later released on Streisand's Duets (2002)
 Tony Bennett – [Yesterday I Heard the Rain (1968)
 Irene Cara in City Heat 
 Dick Hyman – Blues In The Night: Dick Hyman Plays Harold Arlen (1990)
 June Christy – Day Dreams (1995), A Friendly Session, Vol. 3 (1998), Cool Christy (2002)
 Jane Horrocks – Little Voice (1998)
 Brad Mehldau – Anything Goes (2004)
 Rufus Wainwright – Rufus Does Judy at Carnegie Hall (2007)
 Johnny Dankworth – The Best Of Johnny Dankworth (2008)
 Lea Michele and Chris Colfer (medley with "Happy Days Are Here Again") – Glee (2010)
 Hugh Laurie and Lisa Edelstein – House "Bombshells" (2011)
 Pink Martini (medley with "Happy Days Are Here Again") – Get Happy (2013)
 Billy Porter and Cyndi Lauper (medley with "Happy Days Are Here Again") – Billy's Back on Broadway (2014)
 Rebecca Ferguson – Lady Sings the Blues (2015)
 Smoking Popes – Into the Agony (2018)
Sun Kil Moon – This Is My Dinner (2018)
Renée Zellweger & Sam Smith — Judy Soundtrack (2019)

References

Songs with music by Harold Arlen
Pop standards
Songs with lyrics by Ted Koehler
1930 songs
Judy Garland songs
Benny Goodman songs